Wilke is a surname of German origin, which is medieval pet form of the personal name Wilhelm. A related English surname is Wilkie. The surname Wilke may refer to:
Birthe Wilke (born 1936), Danish singer
Christian Gottlob Wilke (1788–1854), German theologian
Günther Wilke (1925–2016), German chemist
Gustav Wilke (1898–1977), German general
Hannah Wilke (1940–1993), American artist
Henry F. Wilke (1857–1931), American politician
Julius A. R. Wilke (1860–1914), American sailor
Kristof Wilke (born 1985), German rower
Marcel Wilke (born 1989), German footballer
Marina Wilke (born 1958), German rowing cox
René Wilke (born 1984), German politician, mayor of Frankfurt (Oder)
Richard Wilke (born 1994), American Businessman
Robert J. Wilke (1914–1989), American actor
Rudolf Wilke (1873–1908), German artist
Ulfert Wilke (1907–1987), American artist
Wotan Wilke Möhring (born 1967), German actor

See also
Wilkes (surname)
Wilkie (surname)
Willke
Willkie

References

German-language surnames
Surnames from given names